Edmund Beaufort may refer to:

 Edmund Beaufort, 2nd Duke of Somerset ( 1406–1455)
 Edmund Beaufort, 4th Duke of Somerset ( 1438–1471)